The 2015 IQA European Games, also known simply as the European Games, was the inaugural European championship for the sport of quidditch organized jointly by Sarteano2015, Quidditch Europe and the International Quidditch Association. The tournament was held the weekend of the 24–26 July 2015 in the city of Sarteano, Italy. France took first against the United Kingdom with a final score of 90*–50, and Norway came in third winning 150*–80 against Belgium.

As these were the first European Games and since Quidditch is still expanding in Europe, the only requirement for teams wishing to compete was to have a national governing body. Planning is underway for the 2017 European Games. Quidditch Europe and the IQA will work together and start accepting bids in the 2015–2016 season.

Organization
After a bidding process released by Quidditch Europe and the IQA, Sarteano was announced as the winner.  Building up to the events, Sarteano established several marketing campaigns across the country, across Europe and in the United States. Teams arrived to major airports within Italy with buses prepared to transport athletes to the site of the Games. The pitches themselves were maintained and organized to offer teams space to practise, to rest and to take shelter. Additionally, the town organized several entertainment events open to the public, from workshops to live concerts.

Competing teams
The following twelve teams competed in the 2015 European Games:

Broadcasting
Unlike many other quidditch events, there was no livestream available. However, volunteers updated a live Twitter account for online followers and several media outlets were present to report on the games.

Match officials
As the games happened during the off-season for most leagues, several officials came from the United States and Canada to referee and snitch events. Most teams supplied volunteer referees to fill in gaps where there was a lack of availability of non-playing officials. There were no player-snitches; in fact, the snitch with the most play time was Nicole Stone of QuidditchUK nicknamed "Little Snitch".

Marketing

The city of Sarteano established an aggressive marketing campaign that extended beyond the city's and country's borders. Importantly, craftspeople and artisans across the city started to sell European Games wares available for a limited amount of time such as pottery, wine and cheese. One of the most ambitious advertising campaigns run was for free bottles of specialty wine where adverts were places across European cities and even in New York.

Structure and results
The tournament structure consisted of an initial pool play where pools consisted of pots which were based on EQC rankings and seasonal performance matched up. The top four teams from each group then would proceed to bracket play, where brackets were decided using the following criteria: games won, head-to-head, QPD and SWIM catches. Finally, matches will end in semi-finals, third place final and the gold medal match.

Notes

Group phase

Group A

Group B

Bracket phase

Final rankings

Prizes
The European Games offered two prizes in total: First Place and MVP. The first place prize was a handcrafted, metal sculpture created by a local artisan for this event, which was awarded to Team France upon their win. The MVP award, a hand-painted artwork, went to player Ollie Craig for his efforts within the tournament.

See also

 International Quidditch Association
 Muggle quidditch
 European Games (quidditch)
 European Quidditch Cup

References

External links
IQA website

Quidditch competitions
2015 in Italian sport
July 2015 sports events in Europe